The Military ranks of Uruguay are the military insignia used by the Armed Forces of Uruguay.

Commissioned officer ranks
The rank insignia of commissioned officers.

Other ranks
The rank insignia of non-commissioned officers and enlisted personnel.

References

External links
 
 
 

Uruguay
Military of Uruguay